Articles related to literature include:

A 
Accent
- Accentual verse
- Accentual-syllabic verse
- Aesthetic movement
- Allegory
- Alliteration
- Allusion
- Ambiguity
- Anecdote
- Antagonist
- Apostrophe
- Assonance
- Author's purpose
- Autobiography

B 
Ballad
- Biography
- Blank verse
- Breve
- Broadside
- Burlesque

C 
Character
- Characterization
- Chronological order
- Climax
- Comedy
- Conceit
- Concrete poem
- Conflict
- Connotation
- Context
- Contrast

- Consonance  -Cordel literature
- Couplet

D 
Dead metaphor
- Detail
- Denouement
- Description
- Dialect
- Dialogue
- Diary
- Didactic literature
- Diphthong
- Doggerel
- Drama
- Dramatic monologue
- Dramatic poetry

E 
Elegy
- Elision
- Emblematic poem
- English studies
- Epic
- Epigram
- Epitaph
- Epithalamium
- Essay
- Eulogy
- Exaggeration
- Excerpt
- Existentialism
- Explorative strategies
- Exposition
- Expressionism
- Extended metaphor
- Eye rhyme

F 
Fable
- Fantasy
- Farce
- Feminine ending
- Fiction
- Flash prose
- Figurative language
- Flashback
- Folk tale
- Foot
- Foreshadowing
- Frame story
- Free verse

G 
Genre

H 
Haiku
- Half rhyme
- Hero/heroine
- Hubris
- Humour
- Hyperbole

I 
Ictus
- Idiom
- Idyll
- Imagist
- Implicit metaphor
- Internal rhyme
- Inciting moment
- Invocation
- Irony

L 
Legend
- Light verse
- Limerick
- Literary criticism
- Literature
- Litotes
- Lyric

M 
Macaronic verse
- Main character
- Masculine ending
- Masculine rhyme
- Memoir
- Merism
- Metamorphosis
- Metaphor
- Metaphysical poet
- Meter
- Metonymy
- Minor character
- Mock heroic
- Moral
- myth

N 
Narrative poem
- Narrator
- Naturalism
- Non-fiction
- Novel

O 
Octet
- Ode
- Onomatopoeia
- Oral tradition
- Oxymoron

P 
Parable
- Parody
- Pastoral
- Pathetic fallacy
- Personification
- Persuasion
- Playwright
- Plot
- Poetic diction
- Poetry
- Point of view
- Prose
- Protagonist

Q 
Quantitative verse
- Quatrain
- Quintain (poetry)
- Quotation

R 
Realism
- Refrain
- Repetition
- Resistance literature
- Resolution
- Rhyme
- Rhyme scheme
- Rhythm

S 
Sarcasm
- Scan (poetry)
- Science fiction
- Sensory language
- Sextet
- Short story
- Simile
- Slash
- Socratic irony
- Soliloquy
- Sonnet
- Sprung rhythm
- Stage direction
- Stanza
- Style
- Subliterature
- Surprise ending
- Surrealism
- Suspense
- Syllabic verse
- Symbol
- Symbolism
- Synecdoche
- Synaesthesia

T 
Tall tale
- Theater
- Theme
- Transferred epithet

U 
Ubi sunt
- Ultraist movement
- Unanimism
- Understatement
- University Wits
- Ut pictura poesis

V 
Variorum
- Vers de société
- Vers libre
- Verse
- Verse novel
- Verse paragraph
- Vice (character)
- Victorian literature
- Vignette (literature)
- Villain/villainess
- Villanelle
- Virelai
- Volta (literature)

W 
War poet
- Whodunit

Y 
Yellow back

Z 
Zeugma

See also
 Glossary of poetry terms
 List of literary terms

 Topics
Wikipedia indexes